The Committee of 100 in Finland (Sadankomitea in Finnish) was founded in 1963, based on the model of the Committee of 100 in Great Britain.

The Committee of 100 has been one of foremost organizations of the peace movement in Finland, especially in the 1960s.

Since 1966 the Committee of 100 has published the magazine Ydin and the online magazine Pax, organises seminars, distributes pamphlets, and lobbies for peace and human rights. It has particularly criticised Finland's refusal to participate in international treaties banning cluster bombs.

Active persons in the Committee of 100 have included the former Finnish Foreign Minister Erkki Tuomioja.

See also
 Committee of 100 (United Kingdom)
 Anti-war
 Peace movement
 Peace News
 CND

References

External links 
 Committee of 100 in Finland

1963 establishments in Finland
Anti–nuclear weapons movement
Political advocacy groups in Finland
Organizations established in 1963